Protocol 1, First Protocol, or Additional Protocol may refer to:

 Protocol I to the Geneva Conventions
 Protocol 1 to the European Convention on Human Rights
 Additional Protocol to the American Convention on Human Rights, more commonly known as the Protocol of San Salvador